André Godinat (9 March 1903 in Reuil – 3 October 1979 in Épernay) was a French professional road bicycle racer. He became French national road race champion in 1931. In 1932, he won a stage in the 1932 Tour de France.

Major results

1928
Nancy-Colmar
1931
Epernay - Chaumont - Épernay
Tour de France:
Winner stage 4
1932
 national road race championships
1934
GP de Thizy
1935
GP de Thizy
Chauffailles

External links 

Official Tour de France results for André Godinat

French male cyclists
1903 births
1979 deaths
French Tour de France stage winners
Sportspeople from Marne (department)
Cyclists from Grand Est